Free EU-Critics (in Swedish: Fria EU-kritiker) was a political project in Sweden launched ahead of the 1995 European Parliament elections. The list presented by the group included members and former members from a variety of political parties, united in their opposition to European Union membership.

The broad majority of the anti-EU-voters chose to vote either for the established anti-EU parties (Left Party and Green Party) or for anti-EU candidates on the lists of other established parties.

Defunct political parties in Sweden
Euroscepticism in Sweden